Sphaerium bequaerti is a species of bivalve in the Sphaeriidae family. It is found in Burundi, the Central African Republic, Malawi and Tanzania. Its natural habitat is freshwater lakes.

References

Molluscs described in 1914
bequaerti
Taxonomy articles created by Polbot